The Grand Canyon Limited was one of the named passenger trains of the Atchison, Topeka and Santa Fe Railway. It was train Nos. 23 & 24 between Chicago, Illinois, and Los Angeles, California.

History

In 1901 the Santa Fe Railroad completed a 64-mile (103-km) branch from Williams, Arizona, to "Grand Canyon Village" at the South Rim of Grand Canyon National Park. The first scheduled train arrived from Williams on September 17 of that year; branch line trains and excursions from Southern California, Chicago, and Texas could run directly to the Rim. On June 29, 1929, service commenced on the Grand Canyon Limited, which became a celebrated vacation train.

The westward train split at Barstow, one section running to San Francisco (Oakland-Richmond) via the Tehachapi Loop while the other continued to Los Angeles. In 1938 it began running via Amarillo instead of La Junta; in 1950 it became two trains west of Kansas City, one by each route.

During World War II the Limited often ran in two or three sections carrying troops. In later years the train lost passengers to the railroad's newer trains such as the Super Chief with its streamlined cars.

The Grand Canyon train lost its name in early 1968 when the railway petitioned the ICC to drop service to Grand Canyon National Park; the train would continue as Trains 23 and 24 until the May 1, 1971, handover of all passenger service to Amtrak. While the Santa Fe had been willing to continue operating its famed Chiefs and the San Diegan, the prospect of having to operate its less successful routes until at least 1976 led it to hand its passenger routes to Amtrak. The Grand Canyon had been an anachronism for some time. It remained a mostly whistle stop train long after the automobile made such scheduling obsolete for passenger service. Despite this, the Santa Fe continued this scheduling model in order to more efficiently deliver mail parcels. However, when the Post Office abruptly pulled its mail contracts in 1967, the Grand Canyon became a particularly large albatross around the Santa Fe's neck, especially when the ICC turned down requests to withdraw the train.

Timeline
 September 17, 1901: The Santa Fe inaugurates service on the  Grand Canyon Railway, running between Williams, Arizona, and the South Rim of Grand Canyon.
 January 1905: The Santa Fe-built El Tovar Hotel opens its doors. The luxurious destination resort is situated just  from the canyon rim.
 June 29, 1929: The Grand Canyon Limited enters service; schedule 66 hours each way between Chicago and Los Angeles.
 June 4, 1938: the Grand Canyon Limited  is rerouted over the Belen Cutoff through Amarillo, Texas. Transit time is reduced to 60 hr 15 min westward and 58 hr 35 min eastward.
 June 2, 1946: The Grand Canyon Limited begins running via Riverside-Fullerton) instead of Pasadena.
 June 8, 1947: The train receives its first diesel locomotives and stainless-steel lightweight passenger cars.  The train is broken into two sections and the name is shortened to the Grand Canyon; the schedule is reduced to 48 hours, 45 minutes.
 July 1968: The Santa Fe discontinues all passenger service to the Grand Canyon National Park although the tracks are retained for freight service; the Grand Canyon train is stripped of its name becoming simply Trains 23 and 24.
May 1, 1971: Amtrak takes over passenger service from the Santa Fe; the Southwest Chief begins service over much of the route.
 May 2, 1971: The final Train 24 that left Los Angeles on April 30 arrives at Dearborn Station in Chicago, ending Santa Fe revenue passenger service.
1974: The Santa Fe abandons the Grand Canyon Railway.
September 17, 1989: Passenger service on the Grand Canyon Railway resumes after being purchased by private owners, independent from the Santa Fe in 1988.
2002: Santa Fe 3751, a preserved steam locomotive, runs on the line as part of the 2002 NRHS Convention. It briefly operated over the Grand Canyon Railway alongside the railroad's steam locomotives 18 and 4960.
May 16, 2012: As part of the State of Arizona's centennial celebration, a 5-day journey to the Grand Canyon took place on a special excursion train of the same name. Santa Fe 3751 and Grand Canyon Railway 4960 pulled the train with the help of an Amtrak heritage unit over the Grand Canyon Railway route.

Equipment used
A variety of steam- and diesel-powered locomotives pulled the Grand Canyon Limited.

The original rolling stock delivered for the second-class Grand Canyon Limited was heavyweight cars built by Pullman-Standard.

 One baggage-dormitory-buffet smoking car
 Two "chair" cars (coaches)
 One dining car
 Three compartment and drawing-room sleepers
 One full open-end observation / parlor car

Train length varied; the train often ran in two or three sections during the summer months.

Near the end of its career, in 1968, a typical consist from Chicago to Kansas City was:

 Two ALCO PAs
 One streamline baggage car
 Two coaches

Notable incidents 

 July 7, 1945: Combined train No. 2 (The Scout) and No. 24, powered by locomotive #3733, strikes a "Caterpillar" shovel. The locomotive's pilot, headlight, and cylinders are damaged.

December 27, 1949: Train No. 23 collides with an automobile at a grade crossing in Highland Park, California, which flattens the wheels on the locomotives.
 May 31, 1951: Combined train is sideswiped by train No. 123 in Chandler, Arizona, derailing cars #RSX 287, express #2558, baggage #1634, and "chair" cars #3108 and #3070. No. 123 cars baggage #1791 and #1601, "chair" cars #3087, #3158, and #1169, diner #1461, lounge #136, and sleepers L.S. Hungerford, Tonelea, Toreva, and Centgate also sustain damage.
 April 5, 1964: Train No. 123 with five diesel locomotives and 16 cars hits a rockslide at   near Doublea, Arizona, which derails the locomotives, ten baggage cars, and a passenger car.

See also
 Grand Canyon Railway
 Passenger train service on the Atchison, Topeka and Santa Fe Railway

Footnotes

References

External links

 Burlington Northern Santa Fe Railway
 California State Railway Museum
 Santa Fe Railway Historical & Modeling Society
 Passenger trains operating on the eve of Amtrak

Named passenger trains of the United States
Passenger trains of the Atchison, Topeka and Santa Fe Railway
Railway services introduced in 1901
Night trains of the United States
Railway services discontinued in 1968
Passenger rail transportation in Illinois
Passenger rail transportation in Missouri
Passenger rail transportation in Kansas
Passenger rail transportation in Colorado
Passenger rail transportation in Texas
Passenger rail transportation in New Mexico
Passenger rail transportation in Arizona
Passenger rail transportation in California